Tissa is a town in Taounate Province, Fès-Meknès, Morocco.

References

Populated places in Taounate Province